Laura Baxter may refer to:

Laura Baxter, character in Flight 7500
Laura Baxter, Miss Teenage America
Laura Baxter, character in Parasomnia (film)
Laura Baxter, character in Another World, see List of Another World cast members
Laura Baxter, character in Don't Look Now